Christelle Cornil (born 28 August 1977) is a Belgian actress. Her acting credits include Le Vélo de Ghislain Lambert, Soeur Sourire, Illegal, Mr. Average, Beauties at War, Julie & Julia, OSS 117: Lost in Rio, My Queen Karo, The Round Up, The Conquerors, Au nom de ma fille and The Unknown Girl. She received the Magritte Award for Best Supporting Actress for Illegal.

References

External links

Living people
Belgian film actresses
Magritte Award winners
1977 births
20th-century Belgian actresses
21st-century Belgian actresses
Belgian television actresses